The Marche regional election of 2000 took place on 16 April 2000.

Vito D'Ambrosio (Democrats of the Left) was re-elected President, defeating Maurizio Bertucci (Forza Italia).

Results

Source: Ministry of the Interior

References

Elections in Marche
2000 elections in Italy